The 1927 Richmond Spiders football team was an American football team that represented the University of Richmond as a member of the Virginia Conference during the 1927 college football season. Led by 14th-year head coach, Frank Dobson, Richmond compiled an overall record of 4–4–1. The team opened the season with a starting lineup at an average weight of just 162 pounds. Richmond played their home games at Tate Field on Mayo Island.

Schedule

References

Richmond
Richmond Spiders football seasons
Richmond Spiders football